Artsyom Viktaravich Salavey (born 1 November 1990) is a Belarusian professional footballer.

Career
Born in Byaroza Raion, Salavey began playing football in FC Dinamo Minsk's youth system. He joined the senior team and made his Belarusian Premier League debut in 2008.

References

External links

1990 births
Living people
Belarusian footballers
Association football midfielders
Belarusian expatriate footballers
Expatriate footballers in Russia
Olympic footballers of Belarus
Footballers at the 2012 Summer Olympics
FC Dinamo Minsk players
FC Torpedo-BelAZ Zhodino players
FC Ural Yekaterinburg players
FC Neman Grodno players
FC Vitebsk players
FC Shakhtyor Soligorsk players
FC Gorodeya players
FC Sputnik Rechitsa players
People from Byaroza District
Sportspeople from Brest Region